Knights of Columbus Hall is an historic building at 722 East Union Street in Seattle, in the U.S. state of Washington.

See also
 List of Seattle landmarks
 National Register of Historic Places listings in Seattle

External links
 

Buildings and structures in Seattle
National Register of Historic Places in Seattle